Álvaro (died 11 September 1185 in Lisbon, Kingdom of Portugal) was the second Bishop of Lisbon from 1166 until his death. He is buried in St. James' Chapel in Lisbon Cathedral.

See also
Catholic Church in Portugal

References

 

Bishops of Lisbon
12th-century Roman Catholic bishops in Portugal
History of Lisbon
Year of birth unknown
1185 deaths